The 1919–20 season was the 28th season of The Football League, and the first season after football was suspended after outbreak of World War I

Compared to 1914–15, the number of Football League member clubs increased from 40 to 44, initially with five new clubs.

Team changes
Resuming after four years, the Football League expanded its numbers by four, maintaining competition in two Divisions of equal size.
During previous such expansions, 1898 and 1905, the relegated clubs from the previous season were re-elected, while the top Second Division sides were promoted as usual.

Following that precedent, the two top Second Division sides in 1915, Derby and Preston did move on up. Chelsea, who had finished 19th that First Division season, were, as expected, re-elected.

Discussion of how the expansion should be handled began on 13 January 1919 when James Catton published an article in Athletic News raising the issue of match-fixing which had dogged the 1914/15 League season and been left unresolved because of the cessation of the League for the duration of the war.  

In the article, Catton argued one of the two teams that ought to be returned to the first division (if that league was to be expanded, as had already been proposed), should be Chelsea as they had been relegated due to the match-fixing.  Catton then considered the argument that Tottenham, who had also been relegated with Chelsea should likewise be reinstated, although he noted there was nothing to link Tottenham’s relegation with anything amiss in the final season before the cessation of the League for the duration.

In 1915, Manchester United avoided relegation by winning a game against Liverpool 2-0 on 2 April 1915 which was fixed in United's favour, with players from both sides benefiting from bets placed upon the result 1915 British football betting scandal. At the end of the season, Manchester United finished one point and one place ahead of Chelsea. Had the game against Liverpool ended in a draw Chelsea would have finished ahead of United on goal average, if Liverpool had won then Chelsea would have finished one place and one point ahead of Manchester United.

Arsenal, who had finished 6th in the Second Division in 1914-15 (later amended to 5th place in 1975 after an error in the calculation of goal average was discovered) were also elected to the First Division.

It has been alleged that Arsenal Chairman Sir Henry Norris bribed or in some way unduly influenced the voting members of the Football League, in particular, Football League President John McKenna at the League's AGM and that McKenna made a speech recommending Arsenal's promotion ahead of Spurs thanks to the formers' longer spell in the League (Arsenal joined in 1893, Spurs in 1908), although Barnsley and Wolves, who both finished ahead of Arsenal, had been members of the league longer than Arsenal; Wolves since its inception in 1888.  However, detailed reports of the meeting in The Sportsman, Athletic News, Daily Mirror and The Times the following day made no mention of this. They did report that Football League Management Committee member C.E. Sutcliffe made a speech stating that the expansion would give them an opportunity to do right by Chelsea. It would seem strange if such a speech were made by the League President and somehow all the media failed to report it. Arsenal have not been relegated from the top flight of the English game since, the only club in continuous membership since 1919.

In the Second Division, Port Vale took over from Leeds City after 4 October 1919, when Leeds were disbanded by F.A. order following alleged irregular practices. Port Vale then inherited Leeds’ record up to that date.

After the season, Grimsby Town were relegated to the newly formed Third Division. Lincoln City was not re-elected to Second Division and Leeds United was elected to replace it. Cardiff City were elected to take the second available place in Second Division.

Final league tables
The tables and results below are reproduced here in the exact form that they can be found at The Rec.Sport.Soccer Statistics Foundation website and in Rothmans Book of Football League Records 1888–89 to 1978–79, with home and away statistics separated.

Beginning with the season 1894–95, clubs finishing level on points were separated according to goal average (goals scored divided by goals conceded), or more properly put, goal ratio. In case one or more teams had the same goal difference, this system favoured those teams who had scored fewer goals. The goal average system was eventually scrapped beginning with the 1976–77 season. From the 1894–95 season and until the 1920–21 season the re-election process was required of the clubs which finished in the bottom three of the league.

First Division

Results

Maps

Second Division

Results

Maps

See also
1919–20 in English football
1919 in association football
1920 in association football

References

Sources
Ian Laschke: Rothmans Book of Football League Records 1888–89 to 1978–79. Macdonald and Jane’s, London & Sydney, 1980.

English Football League seasons